

The Lorado Mine was a uranium mine in northern Saskatchewan, Canada located around  south of the community of Uranium City, Saskatchewan in the Beaverlodge Uranium District.

See also
Gunnar Mine
Eldorado, Saskatchewan
Uranium ore deposits

References

External links

Uranium mines in Canada
Mines in Saskatchewan
Underground mines in Canada
Uranium City, Saskatchewan
Division No. 18, Saskatchewan